Sir Edward Winnington, 2nd Baronet (14 November 1749 – 9 January 1805), of Stanford Court, Stanford-on-Teme, Worcestershire, was a British baronet and politician.

He was the eldest son of Sir Edward Winnington, 1st Baronet. His father arranged for George Butt to be his tutor and he accompanied him when he started at Christ Church, Oxford.

Winnington married Anne, daughter of Thomas, 1st Lord Foley, by whom he had five sons, of whom the eldest, Thomas, succeeded him.

He was MP for Droitwich, Worcestershire between 1777 and 1805. He was elected a Fellow of the Royal Society in January 1805 but had died the day before.

References 

1749 births
1805 deaths
Baronets in the Baronetage of Great Britain
British MPs 1774–1780
British MPs 1780–1784
British MPs 1784–1790
British MPs 1790–1796
British MPs 1796–1800
Members of the Parliament of Great Britain for English constituencies
Members of the Parliament of the United Kingdom for English constituencies
People from Malvern Hills District
UK MPs 1801–1802
UK MPs 1802–1806
Fellows of the Royal Society